Las Naves Canton is a canton of Ecuador, located in the Bolívar Province.  Its capital is the town of Las Naves.  Its population at the 2001 census was 5,265.

Demographics
Ethnic groups as of the Ecuadorian census of 2010:
Mestizo  82.4%
Montubio  8.1%
Afro-Ecuadorian  4.4%
White  3.6%
Indigenous  1.4%
Other  0.1%

References

Cantons of Bolívar Province (Ecuador)